Ljay Wyatt Newsome (born November 8, 1996) is an American professional baseball pitcher in the San Francisco Giants organization. He was drafted by the Seattle Mariners in the 26th round of the 2015 MLB draft. He previously played in Major League Baseball (MLB) for the Mariners.

Career

Amateur career
Newsome attended Chopticon High School in Morganza, Maryland. He led Chopticon High School to the 2015 Maryland 3A state championship, by pitching a complete game one-hit shutout with 17 strikeouts in the deciding game. Newsome was named the 2015 Gatorade Maryland Baseball Player of the Year. He was drafted by the Seattle Mariners in the 26th round, with the 785th overall selection, of the 2015 MLB draft and signed with them.

Professional career
Newsome spent his professional debut season of 2015 with the Arizona League Mariners, going 1–0 with a 0.84 ERA over  innings. He spent the 2016 season with the Everett AquaSox, going 6–3 with a 4.30 ERA and 58 strikeouts over  innings. He spent the 2017 season with the Clinton LumberKings, going 8–9 with a 4.10 ERA and 111 strikeouts over  innings. Newsome was the 2017 recipient of the Mariners "60 feet 6 inch" award. 

Newsome split the 2018 season between the Modesto Nuts and the Tacoma Rainiers, going a combined 6–10 with a 4.89 ERA and 125 strikeouts and 172 hits over  innings. He split the 2019 season between Modesto, the Arkansas Travelers, and Tacoma, going a combined 9–10 with a 3.54 ERA and 169 strikeouts over 155 innings.

On August 15, 2020, Newsome’s contract was selected to the active roster. He made his major league debut on August 20 against the Los Angeles Dodgers, pitching 3 innings of 1 run ball.  Newsome finished his rookie season with the Mariners making 4 starts, earning a 5.17 ERA and 9 strikeouts and 20 hits in 15 innings in the process.

On May 13, 2021, Newsome was placed on the 60-day injured list with a UCL injury. On the season, he recorded a 7.98 ERA in 7 appearances with 16 strikeouts.

St. Louis Cardinals
Newsome was claimed off waivers by the St. Louis Cardinals on October 22, 2021. in 2022 he was 1-1 with a 4.38 ERA in 12.1 innings. He elected free agency on November 10, 2022.

San Francisco Giants
On December 15, 2022, Newsome signed a minor league contract with the San Francisco Giants.

References

External links

1996 births
Living people
People from La Plata, Maryland
Baseball players from Maryland
Major League Baseball pitchers
Seattle Mariners players
Arizona League Mariners players
Everett AquaSox players
Clinton LumberKings players
Modesto Nuts players
Tacoma Rainiers players
Arkansas Travelers players